Liu Huajin (born 2 August 1960) is a Chinese hurdler. She competed in the 100 metres hurdles at the 1984 Summer Olympics and the 1988 Summer Olympics.

References

1960 births
Living people
Athletes (track and field) at the 1984 Summer Olympics
Athletes (track and field) at the 1988 Summer Olympics
Chinese female hurdlers
Olympic athletes of China
Place of birth missing (living people)
Asian Games medalists in athletics (track and field)
Asian Games gold medalists for China
Medalists at the 1990 Asian Games
Athletes (track and field) at the 1990 Asian Games